Michael Heine (born ) is an Australian businessman. He is best known as the founder and managing director of Netwealth, an ASX-listed funds management and financial technology firm established in 1999. He became a billionaire in 2018 and  according to the Financial Review Rich List he had a net worth of 2.79 billion. He was previously involved in various other ventures with his father Walter and brother Leslie, including Heine Brothers, Heine Management, Heine Finance, and Eurolynx.

Early life
Heine is the son of Walter Heine, who was born in Leipzig, Germany, into a family of textile merchants. His father moved to the United Kingdom in the 1930s to escape antisemitism and was subsequently sent to Australia as an enemy alien aboard . In 1946 he established Heine Brothers (Australasia) Pty Ltd, which initially focused on food processing but later engaged in commodities trading.

Heine joined the family business after leaving high school and holds no tertiary qualifications.

Career
After their father's death in 1978, Heine and his brother inherited the family company. He briefly moved to England to run an investment company, Heine Bros England, but it was liquidated in 1981. The brothers subsequently expanded into property management, as Heine Management, and investment and mortgage finance, as Heine Finance.

In 1986, Heine and his brother publicly listed their holding company Eurolynx, retaining a 25 percent stake. In the same year, Eurolynx bought Wheatley Communications, which held several radio station licences in New South Wales and Victoria, for $90 million from Heine's friend Glenn Wheatley. It was quickly onsold to Hoyts for $130 million and renamed Hoyts Media, but the nominal profit was eventually reversed following a revaluation as Eurolynx maintained a 25 percent holding. In 1993 Heine Management bought Australia's then-tallest building, 120 Collins Street, for $286 million.

In 1999 Heine sold his shares in Heine Management to Mercantile Mutual, a subsidiary of ING, for $112 million. He used the proceeds to established Netwealth "with a handful of staff and a business plan to build an online platform for financial advisers to manage their clients' investments on offering dozens of products with state-of-the-art technology". It reportedly took five or six years to break even. In 2017, he listed Netwealth on the Australian Stock Exchange (ASX). Its share price rose 44 percent on the first day of trading.

Net worth
In 1990, the Australian Financial Review estimated Michael and Leslie Heine to have a combined net worth of 140 million. He became a nominal billionaire in 2018 and was listed on the Financial Review Rich List for the first time with net wealth of 1.27 billion. By 2021 his net wealth had increased to 2.79 billion.

References

Year of birth missing (living people)
Australian billionaires
Living people
Businesspeople from Melbourne
Australian people of German-Jewish descent
Australian company founders
Australian financial businesspeople